Tamale Technical University (TTU), initially called Tamale Polytechnic(T.poly), is located in the northern part of Ghana. and at an area usually nick named as Education ridge

Faculties and departments

Faculty of Applied Arts 

 Languages and Liberal Studies
 Industrial Art
 Media & Communication Studies
 Fashion, Design & Textiles

Faculty of Applied Science & Technology 

 Computer Science
 Hospitality & Tourism Management (HTM)
 Statistical Sciences

Faculty of Business 

 Accountancy
 Marketing
 Secretaryship and Management Studies

Faculty of Engineering 

 Agricultural Engineering
 Automotive Engineering
 Electrical and Electronic Engineering
 Mechanical Engineering
 Tropical Agriculture
 Water and Sanitation Engineering
 Welding and Fabrication

Faculty of Built and Natural Environment 

 Building Technology
 Civil Engineering
 Wood Technology

External links
Official website

References 

Tamale Technical University
Northern Region (Ghana)